Joseph-Marie Trịnh Văn Căn (19 March 1921 - 18 May 1990) was a Vietnamese cardinal of the Catholic Church. He was the Archbishop of Hanoi from 1978 until his death. He became a cardinal in 1979, ordained by Pope John Paul II.

He was born in Ha Nam. In 1949, he was ordained a priest. At 1963, Pope John XXIII appointed him to be a Titular Archbishop of Aela and Coadjutor Archbishop of Hanoi. He became Archbishop of Hanoi in 1978, after the death of Joseph-Marie Trịnh Như Khuê. He died on May 18, 1990 after a heart attack. Successor by Paul Joseph Phạm Đình Tụng.

References

External links
Vietnam Law Newspaper, (Vietnamese language) Câu chuyện ít biết về bức tranh "Đức mẹ Việt Nam" được trưng bày ở thành Rome Retrieved 15/02/2019.

Vietnamese cardinals
Cardinals created by Pope John Paul II
People from Hà Nam Province
1921 births
1990 deaths
20th-century Vietnamese Roman Catholic priests